Sidi Akkacha is a town and commune in Chlef Province, Algeria. According to the 1998 census, it had a population of 23,374.

References

Communes of Chlef Province
Cities in Algeria
Algeria